Dr Hab. Janusz Jan Spyra (born 26 October 1958) is a Polish historian. He is specializing in history of Cieszyn Silesia.

He graduated from the Jagiellonian University. In 1994 he gained a Ph.D. from the University of Silesia. In 2007 Spyra passed his habilitation. In 2017 he gained a title of professor.

Works 
 Żydowskie zabytki Cieszyna i Czeskiego Cieszyna (1999)
 Dzieje miłosierdzia: Zgromadzenie Sióstr Miłosierdzia św. Karola Boromeusza w Cieszynie (1876-2001) (2002, with Fabiana Izydorczyk)
 Cieszyn - mały Wiedeń (2003, with Mariusz Makowski)
 Moneta w dawnym Cieszynie (2005)
 Żydzi na Śląsku Austriackim (1742-1918): Od tolerowanych Żydów do żydowskiej gminy wyznaniowej (2005)
 Szlak książąt cieszyńskich: Piastowie (2007)
 Wisła: dzieje beskidzkiej wsi do 1918 roku (2007)
 Via sacra - kościoły i klasztory w Cieszynie i Czeskim Cieszynie (2008)
 Żydowskie gminy wyznaniowe na Śląsku Austriackim (1742-1918) (2009)
 Śląsk Cieszyński w okresie 1653-1848 (2012)
 Historiografia a tożsamość regionalna w czasach nowożytnych na przykładzie Śląska Cieszyńskiego w okresie od XVI do początku XX wieku (2015)
 Biografický slovník rabínů rakouského Slezska (2015)
 Rabbiner in der Provinz. Die Rolle des Rabbiners im Leben der jüdischen Gemeinschaft in Teschener und Troppauer Schlesien, Berlin: Peter Lang 2018 (= Polnische Studien zur Germanistik, Kulturwissenschaft und Linguistik; Band 9)
 Nauczyciele oraz ich stowarzyszenia na tle dyskursu społecznego w modernizującej się Europie (na przykładzie Śląska Austriackiego) (2019) (co-author: Marzena Bogus)

References

Further reading 
 Noty o autorach (2008). In: Archiwa i archiwalia górnośląskie. Vol. 1. Katowice.
 Leksykon czeskich i polskich muzealników Górnego Śląska. Katowice 2007.

External links 
 Profile at Nauka Polska portal

Jagiellonian University alumni
People from Cieszyn Silesia
20th-century Polish historians
Polish male non-fiction writers
1958 births
Living people
University of Silesia in Katowice alumni
21st-century Polish historians